Olha Basanska (born 6 January 1992) is a Ukrainian footballer who plays as a defender and has appeared for the Ukraine women's national team.

Career
Basanska has been capped for the Ukraine national team, appearing for the team during the 2019 FIFA Women's World Cup qualifying cycle.

In 2019 director of the Russian club Ryazan-VDV claimed that she was forced to release Basanska due to "psychological pressure" from her homeland. The Russian Airborne Troops are known also by their acronym VDV and were among the first who were used during the 2014 Russian aggression against Ukraine.

References

External links
 
 
 

1992 births
Living people
People from Nikopol, Ukraine
Ukrainian women's footballers
Women's association football defenders
Ryazan-VDV players
WFC Zhytlobud-1 Kharkiv players
Ukraine women's international footballers
Ukrainian expatriate women's footballers
Ukrainian expatriate sportspeople in Russia
Expatriate women's footballers in Russia
Ukrainian expatriate sportspeople in Armenia
Expatriate footballers in Armenia
Sportspeople from Dnipropetrovsk Oblast